Vince Black was
 a martial artist and doctor of Traditional Chinese Medicine.  He specializes in the internal Chinese styles of xingyiquan and baguazhang.  

Vince Black began studying the martial arts in the early 1960s with Kajukenbo instructor Jay LaBistre in Yuma, Arizona. His first xingyiquan teacher was John Price. Later he met Hsu Hung-Chi during a visit to the Los Angeles in 1973.

Their first meeting would lead to a ten-year relationship with Hsu, on occasion Black visited his school in Taiwan to receive instruction from his senior students.  Black trained with Hsu when he came to California, hosted Hsu at his school in Yuma, and went to Taiwan on several occasions, including a trip in 1980 in which he participated in the Cheng Chung Cup invitational tournament and won the super heavyweight division.

Besides xingyiquan, Black also learnt Traditional Chinese Medicine, tuina, bone-setting, and herbal applications for injuries.  In 1985 Black received his Diploma in Acupuncture with the National Certification of Acupuncturists.  In 1986, he received his Doctor of Oriental Medicine degree from California Acupuncture College in San Diego. Following Hsu Hong-chi's death in 1984, and in accordance with his teacher's advice, Black continued to seek out other teachers in the Chinese Internal Arts.  He traveled extensively throughout mainland China. 

Some notable instructors with whom Black has trained include Sijo Adriano Emperado (the accredited founder of Kajukenbo, who lived with Black during much of the 1980s), Li Ziming (founder of the Bagua Zhang research association for 20 years, who taught Black Liang Zhenpu Orthodox baguazhang), Li Guichang (Shanxi xingyiquan), Liao Wuchang (monkey boxing and traditional Chinese medicine), York Y. Lu (acupuncture, Chinese herbs, and Liuhebafa), Fu Shu Yun (baguazhang and xingyiquan), Liu Wanfu (baguazhang and xingyiquan), Zhang Huasen (Orthodox baguazhang), and Wang Shusheng (Gao style baguazhang).  Black also studied at the China Shanghai International Training Centre, and interned at various hospitals in Shanghai.

In September 1990, Black founded The North American Tang Shou Tao Association (NATSTA).  The purpose of NATSTA is to research, promote, and preserve Traditional Chinese Medicine and Traditional Chinese Martial Arts.

On Tuesday 26 of February 2019, he died in Arizona. We all his students and friends will remember him and continue passing his knowledge and wisdom to the world.

External links 
 North American Tang Shou Tao (founded by Vince Black)

Living people
Traditional Chinese medicine practitioners
American baguazhang practitioners
Xingyiquan practitioners
Year of birth missing (living people)
Place of birth missing (living people)